Kalaignar Murasu is a Tamil-language 24x7 movie channel that was owned by Kalaignar TV Private Limited. Earlier it was launched as a classic movie and classic music channel. It was launched on 26 January 2012.

History 
Kalaignar Murasu was launched on 26 January 2012 at the day of Republic Day launched by the Former Chief Minister of Tamil Nadu M. Karunanidhi.

Movie Channel 
 In 10 October 2021 Kalaignar Murasu was refreshed in to 24×7 movie channel.
 In Weekdays, It airs old movies on 6am, 11am and 15pm. 
 In Weekdays, Evening It airs Super Hit Movies on 18pm and 21:30pm.
 In Weekend, It aired Super Hit Movies on 6am, 9am, 12pm, 15pm, 18pm and 21pm.

References

External links 
Official facebook page of Murasu TV

Tamil-language television channels
Television channels and stations established in 2012
Television stations in Chennai
2012 establishments in Tamil Nadu
Tamil-language television stations